691 Lehigh is a minor planet (the earlier term for an asteroid) orbiting the Sun, discovered in 1909.  It is named "Lehigh" after Lehigh University, where its orbit was calculated in the Masters Thesis of Joseph B. Reynolds, following the observations of amateur astronomer Joel Metcalf.

References

External links
 Planet Lehigh: Early Astronomy, Lehigh University – Special Collections
 Lightcurve plot of 691 Lehigh, Palmer Divide Observatory, B. D. Warner (2009)
 Asteroid Lightcurve Database (LCDB), query form (info )
 Dictionary of Minor Planet Names, Google books
 Asteroids and comets rotation curves, CdR – Observatoire de Genève, Raoul Behrend
 Discovery Circumstances: Numbered Minor Planets (1)-(5000) – Minor Planet Center
 
 

Background asteroids
Lehigh
Lehigh
Lehigh University
CD:-type asteroids (Tholen)
19091211